Joanna Godden is a 1921 thriller novel by the British writer Sheila Kaye-Smith. It is a drama set amongst the sheep farmers of Romney Marsh in Kent.

Adaptation
In 1947, the novel served as the basis for the film The Loves of Joanna Godden directed by Charles Frend and starring Googie Withers in the title role.

References

Bibliography
 Margaret Butler. Film and Community in Britain and France: From La Règle Du Jeu to Room at the Top. I.B.Tauris, 2004.

1921 British novels
British novels adapted into films
Novels set in Kent